Sverrir Sverrisson is an Icelandic former footballer who played as a midfielder. His brother is former captain and later manager of the Icelandic national football team, Eyjólfur Sverrisson.

References

External links

1969 births
Living people
Association football midfielders
Icelandic footballers
Iceland international footballers
Iceland youth international footballers
Icelandic expatriate footballers
Allsvenskan players
Knattspyrnufélag Akureyrar players
Malmö FF players
Fylkir players
Expatriate footballers in Sweden
Ungmennafélagið Tindastóll men's football players